Vardø is a municipality in Troms og Finnmark county in the extreme northeastern part of Norway. Vardø is the easternmost town in Norway, more to the east than Saint Petersburg or Istanbul. The administrative centre of the municipality is the town of Vardø. Two of the larger villages in the municipality are Kiberg and Svartnes.

The  municipality is the 189th largest by area out of the 356 municipalities in Norway. Vardø is the 284th most populous municipality in Norway with a population of 1,897.

General information

The town of Vardø and the rural district around it was established as a municipality on 1 January 1838 (see formannskapsdistrikt law). The law required that all towns be separated from their rural districts, but because of a low population and very few voters, this was impossible to carry out for Vardø in 1838. (See also Hammerfest and Vadsø.) The rural district of Vardø (Vardø landdistrikt, which was renamed Båtsfjord in 1957) was officially separated from the town of Vardø in 1868. During the 1960s, there were many municipal mergers across Norway due to the work of the Schei Committee. On 1 January 1964, the eastern part of Båtsfjord merged with the town of Vardø to create Vardø Municipality.

On 1 January 2020, the municipality became part of the newly formed Troms og Finnmark county. Previously, it had been part of the old Finnmark county.

Name
The Old Norse form of the name was Vargøy. The first element is vargr which means "wolf" and the last element is øy which means "island". The first element was later replaced (around 1500) with varða which means "cairn". Historically, the name was spelled Vardöe.

Coat of arms

The coat of arms dates to 1898. Its borders are drawn using the national colours: red, white, and blue. The border frames the shield, and the centre field shows a complex scene incorporating a sunrise with rays, two fishing boats with crews, the sea with waves, and a large cod. In the chief is the year of the town's foundation, 1789, together with the words "Vardöensis Insignia Urbis", meaning "the seal of the town of Vardø". In the lower part of the arms is the town motto: "Cedant Tenebræ Soli", meaning "Darkness shall give way to the sun." This is a high resolution version of the coat of arms.

Churches

The Church of Norway has one parish within the municipality of Vardø. It is part of the Varanger prosti (deanery) in the Diocese of Nord-Hålogaland.

History

Vardø has a long settlement history before it was granted status as a town in 1789. Several stone-age sites as well as sites dating from the Sami Iron Age are known on the island. In the Medieval period, Vardø's importance grew as a result of it being the easternmost stronghold of the then-expanding Norwegian royal power. A church was built in Vardø in 1307, and the first fortress was established at about the same time. Thick cultural layers in the southeastern part of the town, Østervågen, document continuous habitation in this area reaching back at least some 800 years.

Even if the presence of the fortress and king's bailiff gave Vardø a certain degree of permanence and stability not experienced by other fishing communities in Finnmark, the town's size and importance waxed and waned with the changing fortunes of the fisheries. In the mid-16th century Vardø had a population of 400 to 500 people. By 1789, however, it had reduced to about 100.

In the 17th century, Vardø was the center of a great number of witchcraft trials. More than 90 persons, Norwegian and Sami, were given death sentences. They are commemorated in the Steilneset Memorial.

In 1769, the Hungarian astronomer Maximilian Hell and his assistant János Sajnovics, delegated by Christian VII of Denmark, traveled to Vardø to observe the Transit of Venus.

After 1850, the town saw a marked expansion. The fisheries grew in importance, and so did the Pomor trade with Russia's White Sea region. In 1850 the population reached 400, and in 1910 it passed 3 000.

During World War II, with Norway occupied by the German Wehrmacht, Vardø was heavily bombed by Allied, mostly Russian forces. Most of the town center was destroyed, and the population was evacuated. After the war, the city center was completely reconstructed, but older, traditional houses survived in the periphery, such as in the old town in Østervågen.

As of 2017, the fishing industry had collapsed. From 1995 to 2017, the population shrank by 50 percent to 2,100 people. In May 2017 work to lay a new electric cable from the Norwegian mainland to the island began. The additional electricity is needed to power the American-funded GLOBUS space surveillance system, located about 40 miles from Russia's Kola Peninsula, a territory studded with high-security naval bases and restricted military zones. The secrecy surrounding the radar systems has spawned fears that officials are covering up health hazards and other possible dangers. The electromagnetic pulses the current radar system emits interfere with television and radio reception, and some residents have blamed them for a rash of miscarriages and cancer cases in a civilian district next to the fenced-in security zone.

The town was selected as the millennium site for Finnmark county.

Government
All municipalities in Norway, including Vardø, are responsible for primary education (through 10th grade), outpatient health services, senior citizen services, unemployment and other social services, zoning, economic development, and municipal roads. The municipality is governed by a municipal council of elected representatives, who in turn elect a mayor. The municipality falls under the Øst-Finnmark District Court and the Hålogaland Court of Appeal.

Municipal council
The municipal council  of Vardø is made up of 19 representatives elected to four-year terms. The party breakdown of the council is as follows:

Mayors
The mayors of Vardø:

1838–1840: Andreas Esbensen Brodtkorb
1841–1848: Paul Holst Conradi 
1849–1850: Søren Engelhardt Schultze 
1851–1854: Johan Daniel Stub Landmark 
1855–1858: Christian Fredrik Wilhelm Scharffenberg 
1859–1860: Thorvald Eid 
1861–1866: Anton Johan Holmboe  
1867–1871: Johan Carl Richard Wisløff
1871–1872: Arnt Nikolai Brodtkorb 
1873-1873: Severin Carl Magnus Thornæs
1874–1875: Thorvald Andreas Kyhn
1876–1879: Lauritz Evje
1880-1880: Karsten Andreas Zachariassen 
1881–1887: Lauritz Leganger Uchermann 
1888-1888: Nikolai Christian Grove Prebensen (H)
1889–1891: Søren I. Meyer
1892–1896: Ivar Andreas Nordang 
1897-1897: Martin Olsen 
1898-1898: Kristian Dahl 
1899–1901: Martin Olsen
1902–1904: Henning Laurits Brodtkorb 
1905–1907: Olav Martin Olsen 
1908–1913: Sivert Magnus Gundersen 
1914–1916: Karl Marenius Ivarsson  
1917-1917: Sivert Magnus Gundersen
1917–1918: Hans Hansen Sætrum 
1918–1919: Ingebrikt Nygaard 
1920–1922: Iver Albert Olsen Grøttum 
1923–1925: Henning Laurits Brodtkorb 
1926–1930: Jon Andrå 
1931–1941: Peder Ragnar Holt 
1941–1944: Erling Pedersen 
1944–1945: Richard Bodin 
1946–1959: Rudolf Olsen 
1959–1968: Karl Holt 
1968-1979: Hjalmar Halvorsen 		
1979–1981: Alf Sverre Olsen
1982–1991: Tor Andreas Kofoed (Ap)
1995–2003: Hermod Larsen (H)
2003–2007: Rolf Einar Mortensen (Ap)
2007-2015: Lasse Haughom (FrP)
2015-2019: Robert Jensen (Ap)
2019–present: Ørjan Jensen (MDG)

Geography

Vardø is the easternmost town in Norway and the Nordic countries, located at 31°E, which is east of Saint Petersburg, Kyiv and Istanbul. The eastern part of Finnmark is in the same time zone as the rest of the country, despite daylight shifted by more than an hour. The town is on the island of Vardøya, but the municipality includes significant area on the mainland of the Varanger Peninsula, including part of the Varangerhalvøya National Park in the southwest.

The mountain Domen lies on the shore of the Varanger Peninsula. South of it lies the small Kibergsneset peninsula, where the village of Kiberg is. The town lies on the island of Vardøya, which is surrounded by a few smaller islands. Hornøya is one of them. It is northeast of Vardøya and is the site of Vardø Lighthouse. The mouth of the Varangerfjorden lies along the municipality's eastern coast.

Climate
The port of Vardø, on the Barents Sea, remains ice-free all year round thanks to the warm North Atlantic drift. Vardø earlier had a tundra climate (Köppen: ET), but as a result of warming, Vardø now has a subarctic climate (Köppen: Dfc) using the official 1991-2020 period, because the monthly mean temperatures in July and August has passed the  threshold. Excluding high mountain areas, it was earlier the only town in Norway proper (excluding Svalbard and Jan Mayen) with a polar climate. The town is on an unsheltered island in the Barents Sea and treeless. The "midnight sun" is above the horizon from 16 May to 29 July, and the period with continuous daylight lasts a bit longer, polar night from 24 November to 19 January. The average date for first overnight freeze (below ) in autumn is October 12. The weather station Vardø Radio (10 m) started recording in June 1829.

Fauna and flora
The municipality of Vardø with its seabird colonies of Hornøya and Reinøya are among the most interesting on this part of the coast. There is a small breeding population of Brunnich's guillemot as well as larger numbers of razorbill and common guillemot.

The climate is too cold in summer and too windy in winter for trees, but a few planted trees exist in wind-sheltered locations, generally rowans.

Transportation
The island is connected to the mainland via the undersea Vardø Tunnel (Norway's first such structure). Vardø Airport and the settlement of Svartnes are on the mainland opposite the tunnel entrance. Vardø is a port of call on Norway's Hurtigruten ferry service. The town is the northern termination of European route E75, which starts in Sitia, Crete.

Media
The newspaper Østhavet has been published in Vardø since 1997.

Economy and tourism

Fishing and seafood processing remain Vardø's major sources of income, although tourism is starting to become an important economic factor.

Vardø's tourist attractions include the Vardøhus Festning, a fortress dating back to the 14th century (although the present structure dates from 1734); the witchcraft trials memorial; several sea bird colonies; two museums: the Pomor Museum and the Partisan Museum; and remnants of German fortifications from World War II. The Yukigassen competition in Vardø is unique in Norway.

Vardøhus Festning is home to two rowan trees that are diligently nurtured and warmed in winter since they cannot normally survive in Vardø's climate, north of the Arctic tree line. Seven trees were planted in 1960; the one that survived managed to blossom twice, in 1974 and 1981. It finally succumbed to the cold in 2002, but two new saplings have been planted in its place.

In the summer of 2012, Vardø hosted the urban art event Komafest, where 12 international artists painted tens of the town's abandoned houses in a three-week period.

River fishing
Fishing permits (for salmon fishing) are sold for use on specific rivers, including Komag-elva.

Globus II Radar 
Since 1998, the town has housed a radar installation called Globus II. Its official purpose is the tracking of space junk, but due to the site's proximity to Russia and an alleged connection between the Globus II system and US anti-missile systems, the site has been the basis for heated controversy in diplomatic and intelligence circles. In March 2017 and again in February 2018 Russia executed mock air strikes aimed at Vardø, presumably because of the radar site. Both times military aircraft took off from the Kola Peninsula in attack formations, but stopped short of Norwegian airspace.

Sister cities
 Kemijärvi, Finland

Notable people 

 Viktor Esbensen (1881 in Vardø – 1942) a Norwegian mariner, explored the Antarctic region
 Jon Andrå (1888–1966) a Norwegian politician, Mayor of Vardø 1925 to 1930
 Peder Ragnar Holt (1899 in Vardø – 1963) a Norwegian politician, the first person from Finnmark county to be the Governor of Finnmark
 Ada Kramm (1899 in Vardø – 1981) a Norwegian stage and film actress 
 Haakon Bugge Mahrt (1901 in Vardø – 1990) a writer and press attaché at the Norwegian embassy in Paris 1946 to 1971
 Alfred Næss (1927 in Vardø – 1997) a Norwegian playwright and songwriter
 Trond Øyen (1929 in Vardø – 1999) a Norwegian violinist, first violinist with the Oslo Philharmonic
 Hans Kristian Eriksen (1933 in Kiberg – 2014) a non-fiction writer, magazine editor, novelist and short story writer
 John Norum (born 1964 in Vardø) a Norwegian/Swedish rock guitarist, co-founder of the Swedish rock band Europe
 Stefan Johansen (born 1991 in Vardø) a Norwegian professional footballer with over 300 club caps and 55 for Norway

References

External links

Municipal fact sheet from Statistics Norway 
Varanger Museum
Birding in the Vardø area
Varanger.com: tourist information about Varanger area
Vardø – Finnmark's millennium town includes pictures

 
Municipalities of Troms og Finnmark
Populated places of Arctic Norway
1838 establishments in Norway
Barents Sea
Populated coastal places in Norway